Nápoles (Portuguese for Naples) is a Portuguese and Hispanic surname that may refer to
Anna María Nápoles, American behavioral epidemiologist and science administrator
Gustavo Nápoles (born 1973), Mexican football player and manager
Henrique da Veiga de Nápoles (1449–1520), Portuguese nobleman
Henrique Esteves da Veiga de Nápoles (1438–1502), Portuguese nobleman
Janet Lim-Napoles (born 1964), Filipino businesswoman
Jerald Napoles (born 1983), Filipino theater actor and a comedian 
João Esteves da Veiga de Nápoles (1397–1461), Portuguese nobleman 
José Nápoles (1940–2019), Cuban boxer
Leonardo Esteves de Nápoles (c. 1350 – 1421), Portuguese nobleman
Maria Nápoles (born 1936), Portuguese fencer
Sergio Nápoles (born 1989), Mexican association football player
Yaisnier Nápoles (born 1987), Cuban association football player
Yohan Leon Napoles (born 1995), Cuban volleyball player
Yusiel Nápoles (born 1983), Cuban amateur boxer

Portuguese-language surnames
Spanish-language surnames